Puerto Baní Stadium is a stadium in Baní,  Dominican Republic. It is primarily used for baseball and has a capacity of 25,000 spectators. The stadium was opened in 2012.

It is part of a larger development project located 40 miles outside Santo Domingo.

External links
 Stadium website

References

Proposed stadiums
Baseball venues in the Dominican Republic
Proposed buildings and structures in the Dominican Republic